Basketball was one of the many sports which was held at the 1990 Asian Games in Beijing, China between 23 September and 6 October 1990. China won their 5th title in the men's tournament and Korea won their 2nd title in the women's tournament, in the fourth China-Korea finals showdown.

Medalists

Medal table

Draw
The teams were seeded based on their final ranking at the 1986 Asian Games.

Group A
 (1)
 (8)
*

Group B
 (2)
 (7)*

*

Group C
 (3)
 (6)
*

Group D
 (4)*
 (5)*

*

* Withdrew.

Final standing

Men

Women

References
 Men's Results
 Women's Results

External links
 Men's and Women's Results
 Men's Schedule, Results, Standings, Game Information

 
Basketball
1990
1990 in Asian basketball
International basketball competitions hosted by China